Callioplana marginata is a species of flatworm polyclads belonging to the Callioplanidae family.

Callioplana marginata  is widespread throughout the tropical waters of the Indo/ West Pacific area.

This flatworm can reach a maximum size of 8 cm length .

Callioplana marginata has a dark background color going from black, brown to grey with a two marginal bands: a fin white on the edge and a larger orange one. The main physical characteristic of thi species is the pair of non-retractile head tentacles, their body is orange with a white basal line.

References

 Stimpson, W. (1857). Prodromus descriptionis animalium evertebratorum quae in expeditione ad oceanum, pacificum septentrionalem a Republic Federata missa, Johanne Rogers Duce observavit et descripsit. Pars. I. Turbellaria Dendrocoela . Proceedings of the Academy of Natural Sciences of Philadelphia 9: 19–31

External links 
 http://www.marinespecies.org/aphia.php?p=taxdetails&id=483600
 http://seaslugs.free.fr/flatworm/planaire/callioplana_marginata_a.htm
 

Turbellaria